Juan (de) Céspedes may refer to:

 Juan de Céspedes Ruiz (born c. 1501–1573), Spanish conquistador

See also
 Juan Cespedes Uribe (born 1979), Dominican baseball player
 Juan García de Zéspedes (c. 1619–1678), Mexican musician